The  is a toll road in Hyōgo Prefecture, Japan. It is signed E95 under the "2016 Proposal for Realization of Expressway Numbering."

Junction list
 IC - interchange, SIC - smart interchange, JCT - junction, SA - service area, PA - parking area, BS - bus stop, TB - toll gate

See also

Japan National Route 312

References

External links

Regional High-Standard Highways in Japan
Roads in Hyōgo Prefecture
Toll roads in Japan
1973 establishments in Japan